Larry Kehres (born September 7, 1949) is a former American football coach and college athletics administrator. He served as the head football coach at the University of Mount Union—formerly known as Mount Union College—in Alliance, Ohio for 27 seasons, from 1986 to 2012. Kehres also has the most national titles (11: 1993, 1996–1998, 2000–2002, 2005–2006, 2008, 2012), conference titles (23), and unbeaten regular seasons (21) of any coach in college football history. His Purple Raiders set the National Collegiate Athletic Association (NCAA) football record for most consecutive victories with 55, running from 2000 to 2003. He was succeeded as head football coach by his son, Vince. The elder Kehres was also the athletic director at Mount Union from 1985 to 2020. He was inducted into the College Football Hall of Fame in 2017.

Early years
Kehres is a native of Diamond, Ohio. He attended and played quarterback for Portage County's Southeast High School, which shared the 1966 Portage County League championship with Windham High School, before attending Mount Union College from 1967 to 1970. At Mount Union, he played quarterback for the football team. In 1970, he set the school record with a 95-yard touchdown pass against Ohio Northern.

Coaching career

Bowling Green and Johnstown-Monroe
From 1971 to 1972, Kehres was a graduate assistant at Bowling Green State University, while studying for a master's degree in health and physical education.  In 1973, he was the head football coach at Johnstown-Monroe High School.

Assistant coach at Mount Union
In 1974, Kehres returned to Mount Union College as an assistant football coach under head coach Ken Wable. Kehres was an assistant coach and offensive coordinator for 11 years under Wable. Wable had a .564 winning percentage in 24 years as the head coach at Mount Union.

Kehres also started and served as the coach of Mount Union's swim program from 1974 to 1986.

Head coach at Mount Union
In 1985, Kehres became the athletic director at Mount Union. In 1986, he took over as head football coach. His teams have won 11 NCAA Division III Football Championships (1993, 1996–1998, 2000–2002, 2005–2006, 2008, 2012).

Kehres' teams hold several NCAA records. In addition to owning the two longest winning streaks in NCAA history, 54 wins in 1996–1999 and 55 wins in 2000–2003, the Mount Union Purple Raiders won a conference title in 23 of his 27 seasons; at Kehres' retirement, Mount Union had an ongoing streak of 21 conference titles. During his tenure, Kehres only lost eight games and tied three times in conference play. From 1994 to 2005, his squads won 100 consecutive games against Ohio Athletic Conference opponents. The 1994 season was the last under his tenure in which the Purple Raiders lost more than one game. Finally, his record of 72–3 in his final five seasons is the best in college football history, surpassing Tom Osborne's 60–3 in his final five seasons at Nebraska.

Kehres is 3–1 against college football's all-time winningest coach, John Gagliardi, having beaten Gagliardi's St. John's squads twice in playoff match-ups and traded wins in the national title game in 2000 and 2003.

In 2009, Kehres was named first vice president of the American Football Coaches Association (AFCA). He was elected President of the AFCA in January 2010. In 2013, Kehres retired after 27 years as head coach to become the Athletic Director of Mount Union. His son, defensive coordinator Vince Kehres, succeeded him as head coach.

Family
Kehres and his wife, Linda, have three children, Vince, Faith, and Jan. He is also the uncle of current Gannon football head coach Erik Raeburn, who played for him from 1987 to 1990 and then served as his assistant coach for a number of years.

Head coaching record

See also
 List of college football coaches with 200 wins
 List of college football coaches with a .750 winning percentage

References

External links
 

1949 births
Living people
American football quarterbacks
Bowling Green Falcons football coaches
Mount Union Purple Raiders athletic directors
Mount Union Purple Raiders football coaches
Mount Union Purple Raiders football players
College swimming coaches in the United States
High school football coaches in  Ohio
College Football Hall of Fame inductees
People from Portage County, Ohio
Coaches of American football from Ohio
Players of American football from Ohio